Gran Coquivacoa is a Venezuelan gaita zuliana group founded in 1968 by Jesús "Bocachico" Petit, Nelson Suárez, Rody Tigrera, Pedro Arteaga and Manolo Salazar in Cabimas, Zulia State.

They were named Best Gaita Artist at the 2015 Pepsi Venezuela Music Awards.

Discography

Studio albums

See also 
Gaita zuliana
Music of Venezuela

References

External links 
  
 Interview to Neguito Borjas 

Venezuelan musical groups
Zulia